Leslie J. Nutting (born July 4, 1945) was a Republican member of the Wyoming Senate, representing the 7th district from 2011 until 2015. Senate District 7 encompasses Laramie County, which includes the city of Cheyenne. From 2011 until 2013, she was the only woman in the Wyoming Senate.  Nutting was joined by Democrat Bernadine Craft in January 2013.

Elections

2010
Nutting ran a write-in campaign against incumbent Democratic State Senator Kathryn Sessions. She won the Republican primary unopposed and defeated Sessions, 54% to 46%.

2014
Nutting declined to run for a second term, and was succeeded by Republican Stephan Pappas.

Personal life
Nutting received a B.S.N. at Loretto Heights College and an M.S.N. from the University of Colorado.

References

Living people
Republican Party Wyoming state senators
University of Colorado alumni
Politicians from Cheyenne, Wyoming
Women state legislators in Wyoming
People from Garfield County, Colorado
1945 births
21st-century American women